The 2021 Kentucky Wildcats football team represented the University of Kentucky (UK) in the 2021 NCAA Division I FBS football season. The Wildcats played their home games at Kroger Field in Lexington, Kentucky, and competed in the East Division of the Southeastern Conference (SEC). They were led by ninth-year head coach Mark Stoops.

Previous season
Kentucky finished the season with a record of 5–6 (4–6 in the SEC) and as Gator Bowl champions.  Kentucky entered the 2020 season fresh off an 8–5 record and a Belk Bowl championship.

Offseason

Position key

Preseason

Award watch lists 
Listed in the order that they were released

SEC Media Days

Preseason All-SEC teams

Personnel

Coaching staff

Schedule

Spring game
The Wildcats were scheduled to hold spring practices in March and April 2021 with the Kentucky football spring game, which took place in Lexington, KY in April 2021.

Regular season
The 2021 Kentucky regular-season schedule consisted of seven home games and five away games.  UK hosted four SEC opponents: Florida, LSU, Missouri, and rival Tennessee. UK traveled to four SEC opponents: Georgia, Mississippi State, South Carolina, and Vanderbilt. Kentucky was not scheduled to play SEC West opponents Alabama, Arkansas, Auburn, Ole Miss, and Texas A&M in the 2021 regular season. The Wildcats' bye week was during week 8 (on October 23, 2021).

Kentucky's out-of-conference opponents represented the Atlantic Coast Conference (ACC), Southern Conference (SoCon), and Sun Belt Conference (SBC), as well as one FBS independent. The Wildcats hosted SoCon member Chattanooga, SBC member Louisiana-Monroe, and independent New Mexico State. The Wildcats closed out the regular season by traveling to Louisville, KY to face in-state rival Louisville for the Governor's Cup.

Game summaries

Louisiana-Monroe

Sources: Official Box Score

Missouri

Sources:

Chattanooga

Sources:

at South Carolina

No. 10 Florida

This was the Wildcats' first home win over Florida since 1986.

Sources:

LSU

Sources:

at No. 1 Georgia

Sources:

at Mississippi State

Sources:

Tennessee

Sources:

at Vanderbilt

Sources:

New Mexico State

Sources:

at Louisville

Sources:

vs. No. 15 Iowa (Citrus Bowl)

Sources:

Rankings

Statistics

Scoring

Scores by quarter (All Home Games)

Scores by quarter (All Away Games)

Scores by quarter (All Neutral Field Games)

Scores by quarter (Home Games – SEC)

Scores by quarter (Away Games – SEC)

Scores by quarter (Neutral Field – SEC)

Scores by quarter (Home Games – NC)

Scores by quarter (Away Games – NC)

Scores by quarter (Neutral Field – NC)

Scores by quarter (All NC Opponents)

Scores by quarter (All SEC Opponents)

Scores by quarter (All opponents)

Media affiliates

Radio
 WHAS (AM) (News Radio 840 WHAS), WBUL-FM – Nationwide (Dish Network, Sirius XM, TuneIn radio and iHeartRadio)

TV
CBS Family – WKYT (CBS), CBS Sports Network 
ESPN/ABC Family – WTVQ (ABC), ABC, ESPN, ESPN2, ESPNU, ESPN+, SEC Network)
FOX Family – WDKY (FOX), FOX/FS1, FSN
NBC – WLEX, NBC Sports, NBCSN

References

Kentucky
Kentucky Wildcats football seasons
Citrus Bowl champion seasons
Kentucky Wildcats football